The 1946 Penn State Nittany Lions football team was an American football team that represented Pennsylvania State University as an independent during the 1946 college football season. In their 17th year under head coach Bob Higgins, the Nittany Lions compiled a 6–2 record and outscored opponents by a total of 192 to 48.

Penn State halfback Maderak was selected by the International News Service as a second-team player on the 1946 All-Eastern football team.

The team is notable for voting to cancel a scheduled game against the Miami Hurricanes rather than playing without African American players.

The team played its home games in New Beaver Field in State College, Pennsylvania.

Schedule

The scheduled game against the Miami Hurricanes was cancelled in early November by unanimous vote of the Penn State team. Miami officials felt that Penn State fielding their African American players Wallace Triplett and Dennis Hoggard in Miami could have led to "unfortunate incidents", and the team chose to cancel the game rather than playing without Triplett and Hoggard. Miami reportedly invited Syracuse to replace Penn State. This invitation was promptly declined and rebuked in an editorial in The Daily Orange, titled "No Thanks, Miami".

After the season

The 1947 NFL Draft was held on December 16, 1946. The following Nittany Lions were selected.

References

Penn State
Penn State Nittany Lions football seasons
Penn State Nittany Lions football